Senator Hensley may refer to:

Anthony Hensley (born 1953), Kansas State Senate
Joey Hensley (born 1955), Tennessee State Senate
Willie Hensley (born 1941), Alaska State Senate